The Burnside River is a river in the Canadian territory of Nunavut. It has its headwaters at Contwoyto Lake, flows across the Precambrian Shield's Contwoyto Plateau, flows through isolated and rugged tundra, into Lake Kathawachaga, and through the Wilberforce Hills region. Before emptying into Bathurst Inlet on the Arctic Ocean, the Mara River empties into the Burnside River. The river has an island, Nadlak, historically notable for Inuit use of caribou antlers as hut roof infrastructures.

The river is surrounded by continuous permafrost. It is migratory crossing path of Bathurst barren-ground caribou. Wildlife includes Arctic wolf, grizzly bears and muskox, while birds include golden eagle, rough-legged hawk and gyrfalcon. Arctic char, Arctic grayling, lake trout, and whitefish are also found in the river. Plants along the shoreline include dwarf willow and alder, plus 125 different wild flowers.

Copper Inuit artifacts and gravestones are located in the Burnside River area, along with trade items (needles, tools) they received from Dene. The area was explored in 1821 and 1822 by Sir John Franklin of the Hudson's Bay Company. Present day, it is a popular wilderness whitewater canoe route, offering long stretches of continuous whitewater, as well as several more challenging sets of rapids.

See also
List of rivers of Nunavut

References

External links
Photo of Burnside River and Nadlak Island

Rivers of Kitikmeot Region